The Ensham Coal Mine is a coal mine located 40 km east of Emerald in Central Queensland, Australia. The mine has coal reserves amounting to 1.48 billion tonnes of coking coal, one of the largest coal reserves in Asia and the world. The Ensham mine has an annual production capacity of 2 million tonnes of coal.

Ensham consists of six pits on either side of the Nogoa River.   Operations currently utilise the open-cut method of mining.   Extraction is conducted by dragline and truck and shovel operations.  A transition to underground mining is required to access the highest quality coal.

Coal is transported to port via the Blackwater railway system.

As thermal coal prices declined in 2012 mining operations were reduced to 40% of capacity and a further round of permanent job cuts was announced.

Flooding
The mine was inundated by floods in January 2008. Two pits were left filled with water.  One dragline was submerged in 15 metres of water. Total mine damages have been estimated at around $300 million. Because of precaution such as the construction of flood protection levees after the 2008 flood the mine was not affected by the 2010–11 Queensland floods.

See also

Coal in Australia
List of mines in Australia

References 

Coal mines in Queensland
Mines in Central Queensland